Shawoli is a metro station of Zhengzhou Metro Chengjiao line.

Station layout  
The station is an elevated station with 3 levels. The ground level is for the entrances/exits and the 2nd level is for the station concourse and footbridges connecting Exit B. The 2 island platforms are on the 3rd level.

The station is equipped with air-conditioned waiting rooms on its platforms.

Exits

References 

Stations of Zhengzhou Metro
Chengjiao line, Zhengzhou Metro
Railway stations in China opened in 2017